Maxwell's Executors v. Wilkinson, 113 U.S. 656 (1885), was a writ of error brought by the executors of a former collector of the port of New York to reverse a judgment in an action brought against him by the defendant in error to recover duties paid by them on imported iron.

Justice Gray delivered the opinion of the Court:

See also
List of United States Supreme Court cases, volume 113

References

External links
 

United States Supreme Court cases
United States Supreme Court cases of the Waite Court
1885 in United States case law
Port of New York and New Jersey